Events from the year 1743 in France.

Incumbents 
Monarch: Louis XV

Events
 10 May – In New France, Governor Jean-Baptiste Le Moyne de Bienville ends his final term (multiple times over 43 years) as Governor of colonial French Louisiana, which he helped colonize; he is succeeded by the Marquis de Vaudreuil (for the next 10 years) and returns to France.
 The Moët & Chandon champagne house is established by Claude Moët in Épernay as Moët et Cie.

Births
 

 18 January – Louis Claude de Saint-Martin French philosopher, known as le philosophe inconnu. (d. 1803)
 24 May – Jean-Paul Marat, French revolutioner, doctor, scientist (d. 1793)
 17 September – Marquis de Condorcet, French mathematician, philosopher, and political scientist (d. 1794)

Deaths
 

 29 January – Charles-Irénée Castel de Saint-Pierre, French writer (b. 1658)
 16 June – Louise-Françoise de Bourbon, eldest daughter of Louis XIV and Madame de Montespan; she built the Paris Palais Bourbon where she died (b. 1673)
 27 December – Hyacinthe Rigaud, French painter (b. 1659)

See also

References

1740s in France